Anton Joseph Edler von Leeb (13 June 1769 – 6 December 1837) was an Austrian politician and a mayor of Vienna from 1835 to 1837.

References 

Mayors of Vienna
1769 births
1837 deaths
Edlers of Austria